Vetri S3 is a 2016 Tamil soap opera that aired on MediaCorp Vasantham from 27 June 2016 to 22 September 2016 at 10:00PM SST for 47 episodes. The show starred Jaynesh, Eswari Gunasagar, M. Meshanthe, Suriavelan, Manimala M and among others.

Cast

Main cast

 Jaynesh
 Eswari Gunasagan
 M. Meshanthe

supporting cast

 Suriavelan
 Manimala M
 Thulasi Seda Raman
 Kaushik Iyer
 Anwar
 V. Punithan
 N. Prithiveeraj
 K. Kalaiyarasi
 Laavenya Elangovan
 Nivaashyni
 Nazrin Begam
 Janani Vasu
 Rubaneshwaran
 Shwn Sathiya Seelan
 Abhishek Jaya Kumar
 Satthia Nallaiah
 Suguna
 Verapandia
 Durga Lingasparan
 Sri Vatsan
 K.P Viknesh
 Vanitha Vattumalai
 Dhiraj
 Jessica Kalarani
 Ajay Philip

Broadcast
Series was released on 27 June 2016 on Mediacorp Vasantham. It aired in Malaysia on Mediacorp Vasantham, Its full length episodes and released its episodes on their app Toggle, a live TV feature was introduced on Toggle with English Subtitle.

References

External links 
 Vasantham Official Website
 Vasantham Facebook
 Vetri Season 3 Serial Episode

2016 Tamil-language television seasons